The Jedi Academy trilogy is a trilogy of science fiction novels set in the Star Wars Expanded Universe. All three books were written by Kevin J. Anderson and published in 1994. The plot takes place around seven years after the events of the 1983 film Return of the Jedi. The series chronicles Luke Skywalker's early attempts to rebuild the Jedi Order after the defeat of the Emperor. Some of the events in the trilogy are retold from a different perspective in I, Jedi by Michael A. Stackpole.

Books

Jedi Search 
While Luke Skywalker takes the first step toward setting up an academy to train a new order of Jedi Knights, Han Solo and Chewbacca are taken prisoner on the planet Kessel and forced to work in the fathomless depths of a spice mine. After Solo and Chewbacca escape, they desperately flee to a secret Imperial research laboratory surrounded by a cluster of black holes-and go from one danger to a far greater one.

Dark Apprentice 
While the New Republic struggles to decide what to do with the deadly Sun Crusher—a new doomsday weapon stolen from the Empire by Han Solo—the renegade Imperial Admiral Daala uses her fleet of Star Destroyers to conduct guerrilla warfare on peaceful planets.

Champions of the Force 
Kyp Durron continues his rampage to destroy the Galactic Empire with the Sun Crusher to avenge his brother (whom he inadvertently kills when he destroys Carida). Luke, who was in a state of suspended animation after the fight between himself and Exar Kun, made every attempt he can to save his body from the evil spirit of Exar Kun. After reaching out to the Jedi twins, he warns them about the danger. In the end, all the apprentices unite and Exar Kun is destroyed.

Reception
io9 derided the Sun Crusher as an implausible "Mary Sue" vessel, as a "small ship with the ability to destroy entire star systems, thanks to its 11 'energy resonance torpedoes.' It has a hyperdrive, indestructible armor, can withstand shots from the Death Star laser and is basically completely unstoppable — oh, and even the Emperor didn't know about it, because no one would have possibly been able to explain its existence post-RotJ otherwise".

Legacy 
Exar Kun was mentioned in the 2010 reference book The Jedi Path. While most existing Star Wars spin-off works were made non-canon in 2014 following the acquisition of Lucasfilm by Disney, Kun was referenced in the 2018 standalone film Solo: A Star Wars Story.

References

Jedi Search, 1994. Kevin J. Anderson, 
Dark Apprentice, 1st edition paperback, 1994. Kevin J. Anderson, 
Champions of the Force, 1st edition paperback, 1994. Kevin J. Anderson,

External links
.

Book series introduced in 1994
1990s science fiction novels
 
Bantam Spectra books